Pavel Chekhov and Alexey Kedryuk were the defending champions, but Chekhov chose not to compete this year.Kedryuk partnered up with Michail Elgin, but they lost in the first round against Andis Juška and Artem Sitak.
Brendan Evans and Toshihide Matsui won in the final 3–6, 6–3, [10–8] against Gong Maoxin and Li Zhe.

Seeds

Draw

Draw

References
 Main Draw

Fergana Challenger - Doubles
2010 Doubles